Agua Buena  is a corregimiento in Los Santos District, Los Santos Province, Panama with a population of 1,117 . It was created by Law 58 of July 29, 1998, owing to the Declaration of Unconstitutionality of Law 1 of 1982. Its population as of 2000 was 1,117.

References

Corregimientos of Los Santos Province